Dapeng or Da Peng may refer to:

Peng (mythology) or Da Peng, mythological bird
Dapeng (state) (大彭), a state during the late Shang dynasty
Dapeng Peninsula (大鹏半岛), in the east of Shenzhen
Dapeng Subdistrict (大鹏街道), Longgang District, Shenzhen
Dapeng Bay, a longgang in Shenzhen
Mirs Bay, Hong Kong, known as Dapeng Bay
Dapeng New District
Dapeng dialect (大鵬話), Chinese dialect spoken on the Dapeng Peninsula
Dapeng Fortress (大鹏城), in Dapeng Subdistrict
Dapeng International Plaza, skyscraper of Guangzhou
Dapeng, Xuzhou (大鹏所城), town in Tongshan District, guangdong shenzhen
Dapeng LNG terminal
Dong Chengpeng or Da Peng (born 1982), Chinese entertainer and filmmaker